Aurice Lake is located in Glacier National Park, in the U. S. state of Montana. Aurice Lake is immediately west of Mount Rockwell.

See also
List of lakes in Flathead County, Montana (A-L)

References

Lakes of Glacier National Park (U.S.)
Lakes of Flathead County, Montana